The 2020 Daytona 500, the 62nd running of the event, was a NASCAR Cup Series race held on February 16–17, 2020. It was contested over 209 laps—extended from 200 laps due to an overtime finish, on the  asphalt superspeedway. It was the first race of the 2020 NASCAR Cup Series season.

The race was started by President of the United States Donald Trump, who served as Grand Marshal, and the opening lap was paced by the official Presidential state car. WWE professional wrestler Sheamus drove the pace car for the opening laps, and Dale Earnhardt Jr., two-time winner of the Daytona 500, waved the green flag to officially start the race.

The race was scheduled for February 16, but persistent rain showers caused the race to be suspended on lap 20 and postponed until  4 p.m. the following day, the second time the race has had to be postponed due to rain. The first time was in 2012. This was the final Daytona 500 starts for Clint Bowyer, Brendan Gaughan, Leavine Family Racing, Premium Motorsports, and Germain Racing.

Most of the race was cleanly run until lap 185, when The Big One struck, triggering a massive crash involving at least 20 cars on the backstretch. The race was red-flagged as a result. Denny Hamlin won the race by 0.014 seconds over Ryan Blaney on the second restart in overtime. Chris Buescher, David Ragan, and Kevin Harvick rounded out the top five. On the final lap, Ryan Newman was involved in a serious crash and was immediately rushed to a local hospital. Two hours after the crash, it was announced he was seriously injured in the crash, but the injuries were not believed to be life-threatening. Newman was released from the hospital on Wednesday, February 19, and would return to racing at the 2020 The Real Heroes 400.  In the days that followed, many news outlets credit Newman's miraculous survival of his crash to the safety features implemented by NASCAR following the death of Dale Earnhardt at the end of the 2001 Daytona 500.

Report
Daytona International Speedway is a race track in Daytona Beach, Florida that is one of six superspeedways, the others being Auto Club Speedway, Pocono Raceway, Indianapolis Motor Speedway, Michigan International Speedway, and Talladega Superspeedway.

Background

Daytona International Speedway is one of three superspeedways to hold NASCAR races, the other two being Indianapolis Motor Speedway and Talladega Superspeedway. The track's turns are banked at 31 degrees, while the front stretch, the location of the finish line, is banked at 18 degrees.

Entry list
 (W) denotes past 500 winner.
 (R) denotes rookie driver.
 (i) denotes driver who are ineligible for series driver points.

Practice

First practice (February 8)

Second practice (February 8)

Qualifying

Qualifying results

Bluegreen Vacations Duel

The Bluegreen Vacations Duels are a pair of NASCAR Cup Series races held in conjunction with the Daytona 500 annually in February at Daytona International Speedway. They consist of two races 60 laps and 150 miles (240 km) in length, which serve as heat races that set the lineup for the Daytona 500. The first race sets the lineup for cars that qualified in odd-numbered positions on pole qualifying day, while the second race sets the lineup for cars that qualified in even-numbered positions. The Duels set the lineup for positions 3–38, while positions 39 and 40 are filled by the two "Open" (teams without a charter) cars that set the fastest times in qualifying, but did not lock in a spot in the Duels.

For championship purposes, each Duel is a full Championship Stage, except there is no playoff point awarded. The top ten drivers receive championship points.

Duel 1

Duel 1 results

Duel 2

Duel 2 results

Starting lineup

Practice (post–Duels)

Third practice (February 14)

Final practice (February 15)

Race

Finish 
On the second attempt at a green-white-checker finish, Chase Elliott spun just after the lead pack received the white flag, but the green flag stayed out and Denny Hamlin led Ryan Newman and Ryan Blaney through Turn One. Newman and Blaney teamed up to bump-draft past Hamlin down the backstretch but Hamlin managed to tuck in behind Blaney and bump-draft with him through Turns Three and Four. As the three leaders headed for the Tri-Oval and the checkered flag, a push from Hamlin got Blaney's car loose. Fighting for control, Blaney veered to the inside and Newman dove inside to block him. The two cars touched and Newman lost control. His car veered to the right and hit the outside wall head-on, then rolled upside-down and back into the middle of the track. Corey LaJoie's car slammed squarely into Newman's driver's-side window, launching the car into the air and over the start-finish line to finally come to rest near the exit of the pitlane upside-down, on fire and leaking fluid from its destroyed rear end. Meanwhile, the contact with Newman had slowed Blaney just enough to allow Hamlin to catch him at the line and win the race by 0.014 seconds.

Post-race 

In the immediate post-race, Hamlin and his crew, unaware of the severity of Newman's crash, began celebrating his win and was subsequently booed heavily by the crowd upon exiting his car, both on the infield grass and again in victory lane. Joe Gibbs issued an apology for the team's celebration, with Hamlin saying he was first aware of the accident severity when NASCAR canceled the recent tradition of interviewing the winner on the front-stretch prior to the car being driven to victory lane.

Stage Results
Stage One
Laps: 65

Stage Two
Laps: 65

Final Stage Results

Stage Three
Laps: 70

Race statistics
 Lead changes: 23 among 13 different drivers
 Cautions/Laps: 9 for 39
 Red flags: 3 (1 for weather, 2 for accidents)
 Time of race: 3 hours, 42 minutes and 10 seconds
 Margin of Victory: 0.014 seconds
 Average speed:

Media

Television

Since 2001—with the exception of 2002, 2004 and 2006—the Daytona 500 has been carried by Fox in the United States. The booth crew consists of longtime NASCAR lap-by-lap announcer Mike Joy and three–time Daytona 500 champion Jeff Gordon. Pit road is manned by Jamie Little, Regan Smith, Vince Welch, and Matt Yocum. 1992 and 1998 Daytona 500 winning crew chief Larry McReynolds and 2010 Daytona 500 winning driver Jamie McMurray provided insight from the Fox Sports studio in Charlotte.

Radio
The race was broadcast on radio by the Motor Racing Network—who has covered the Daytona 500 since 1970—and simulcast on Sirius XM NASCAR Radio. The booth crew consists of Alex Hayden, Jeff Striegle, and 1989 Cup Series champion Rusty Wallace. Longtime turn announcer Dave Moody is the lead turn announcer, calling the race from atop the Sunoco tower outside the exit of turn 2 when the field races through turns 1 and 2. Mike Bagley works the backstretch for the race from a spotter's stand on the inside of the track & Kyle Rickey calls the race when the field races through turns 3 and 4 from the Sunoco tower outside the exit of turn 4. On pit road, MRN is manned by lead pit reporter and NASCAR Hall of Fame Executive Director Winston Kelley. He will be joined on pit road by Steve Post, Kim Coon, and Dillon Welch.

Standings after the race

Drivers' Championship standings

Manufacturers' Championship standings

Note: Only the first 16 positions are included for the driver standings.

References

2020 NASCAR Cup Series
2020 in sports in Florida
February 2020 sports events in the United States
NASCAR races at Daytona International Speedway